The New Zealand Distinguished Service Decoration (DSD) was instituted by Royal Warrant as a New Zealand Royal Honour in 2007 to recognise distinguished military service, by regular, territorial and reserve members of the New Zealand Defence Force. Until 1995, this type of service was recognised by awards of the British Empire Medal (Military Division). After the change to a totally New Zealand Honours system in 1996, these Commonwealth awards were not available to be awarded to New Zealand military personnel.

Eligibility
All members of the New Zealand Defence Force, or uniformed members of allied forces operating with or alongside units of the New Zealand military are eligible for the decoration. It may be awarded for the outstanding performance of military duties in either warlike or non-warlike operations, or for individual efforts toward peacetime and humanitarian service which brings great credit to the New Zealand Defence Force. The acts must contribute significantly, through exceptional devotion to duty, dedication, judgement or application of skills to the conduct of an operational deployment, the conduct of military training or a military operation or operations, or the management and implementation of a project or activity with significant implications for the current or future capability of the New Zealand Defence Force.  The Distinguished Service Decoration also may be awarded for a single accomplishment or instance of extraordinary performance of duty, or can be awarded for cumulative efforts over a long period of time.

Appearance
The decoration, made of sterling silver, is a representation of a kotiate, a Māori eight bladed war club. In the centre of the kotiate is St Edward’s Crown. The blades alternate between frosted and polished silver. The reverse is inscribed “FOR DISTINGUISHED SERVICE” and its Māori language equivalent “MO NGA TE MAHI KAHURANGI”.  The ribbon is dark blue with a center stripe of red, two narrow yellow stripes separate the red stripe from the blue.

Recipients

References

Military awards and decorations of New Zealand